The Sun Odyssey 33i is a French sailboat that was designed by Marc Lombard as a cruiser and first built in 2008.

The "i" in the designation indicates that the deck is injection-molded.

Production
The design was built by Jeanneau in France, from 2008 until 2014, but it is now out of production.

Design
The Sun Odyssey 33i is a recreational keelboat, built predominantly of polyester fiberglass, with wood trim. The hull is made from solid fiberglass and the deck is a fiberglass sandwich. It has a 9/10 fractional sloop rig, with a deck-stepped mast, two sets of swept spreaders and aluminum spars with stainless steel 1X19 wire rigging. A mast-furling mainsail was a factory option. The hull has a nearly plumb stem, a reverse transom with a swimming platform, an internally mounted spade-type rudder controlled by a wheel and a fixed fin keel, optional shoal-draft keel, or stub keel and steel centerboard.

The fin keel model displaces  and carries  of cast iron ballast, while the shoal draft version displaces  and carries  of cast iron ballast. The centerboard version displaces  and carries  of external cast iron ballast.

A "performance" version of the design has a mast that is about  taller and a sail area that is 16% larger.

The design has sleeping accommodation for four people, with a double "V"-berth in the bow cabin, two straight settees in the main cabin and an aft cabin with a transversal double berth on the starboard side. The galley is on the starboard side just forward of the companionway ladder. The galley is "L"-shaped and is equipped with a two-burner stove, an ice box and a single sink. The head is located aft on the port side at the companionway steps and includes a shower.

Operational history
In a 2009 review for Cruising World, Alvah Simon wrote, "the Sun Odyssey 33i could best be described as a 'platform' boat. Jeanneau provides a performance hull with a racing wheel and fits it out with a full liveaboard interior. Then the builder offers the customer an array of packages that combine different rigs, keels, propellers, and add-ons to either turbocharge the 'platform' up to a full-on around-the-cans racer or set it up as an easy-to-sail coastal or near-offshore family cruiser with an in-mast furling main."

See also
List of sailing boat types

References

External links

Video tour of the Sun Odyssey 33i
Sun Odyssey 33i video

Keelboats
2000s sailboat type designs
Sailing yachts
Sailboat type designs by Marc Lombard Design
Sailboat types built by Jeanneau